The Gurkha Museum commemorates the service of Gurkha soldiers to the British Crown, a relationship that has endured since 1815. It is located in Winchester in Hampshire, England and is part of Winchester's Military Museums.

History 
The Gurkha Museum was first established at Queen Elizabeth Barracks, Church Crookham and was officially opened by Field Marshal Lord Harding on 21 June 1974. From the beginning it was clear that the museum, housed in a wooden barrack block, would need larger and more permanent premises. The closure of the Rifle Depot at Peninsula Barracks, Winchester offered this opportunity. In April 1989 the museum at Church Crookham was closed and the transfer of the artefacts to Winchester began. Field Marshal Lord Bramall officially opened the relocated museum on 16 July 1990.

In 1994, a Gurkha Museum was established at a temporary site in Kathmandu; it moved to Pokhara in 2005 and has become one of the main attractions of the area.

Collections 
Besides tableaux, dioramas, showcases and interactive touchscreen displays, there are visual and audio depictions of Nepal and of the Gurkhas' renowned military history, including the award of 26 Victoria Crosses. The collections tell the story of Gurkha service to the Crown in many wars and campaigns and describe the history of the four Gurkha regiments which transferred to the British Army in 1948 (the Royal Gurkha Rifles, The Queen's Gurkha Engineers, the Queen's Gurkha Signals and the Queen's Own Gurkha Logistic Regiment). There is also a library, archives facility and research room on the second floor.

See also 
 Gurkha
 Brigade of Gurkhas
 The Gurkha Welfare Trust

References

External links 
 The Gurkha Museum
 Gurkha 200
 The Gurkha Brigade Association
 The Gurkha Welfare Trust

British veterans' organisations
Brigade of Gurkhas
Gurkhas
Museums in Winchester
Regimental museums in England
Museums established in 1974
Musical instrument museums